The Matra MS11 is a Formula One car used by the Matra team during the 1968 Formula One season, developed from the successful MS7 F2 car. It was relatively unsuccessful compared to its sibling, the Cosworth DFV powered Matra MS10 which Jackie Stewart drove to second place in the World Drivers' Championship. The major problems were with the V12 engine, which was thirsty, underpowered, unreliable and prone to overheating. The car was raced almost exclusively by Jean-Pierre Beltoise with Henri Pescarolo driving a second car at the end of the season. Its best outing came at the 1968 Dutch Grand Prix where Beltoise finished second behind Stewart, and recorded the fastest lap. In 1969, Matra set aside the V12 project, concentrating on the DFV-powered MS80.

Complete Formula One World Championship results 
(key) (results in bold indicate pole position; results in italics indicate fastest lap)

1 In the 1968 Constructors' Championship, Matra-Ford finished 3rd (45 points), Matra(-Matra) finished 9th (8 points)

References 

Matra MS011